Garfield County is a county located in the U.S. state of Washington. The county seat and only city is Pomeroy.

History
The area delineated by the future Washington state boundary began to be colonized at the start of the nineteenth century, both by Americans and British. However, the majority of British exploration and interest in the land was due to the fur trade, whereas American settlers were principally seeking land for agriculture and cattle raising. The Treaty of 1818 provided for the creation of a British and American condominium over the region. During this period, the future Washington Territory was divided into two administrative zones: Clark County and Lewis County (made official in 1845).  However, the condominium arrangement was unwieldy, leading to continuous disputes and occasional conflict; it was abolished by an 1846 treaty that established a boundary between British and American possessions that survives as today's Canada–United States border.

In 1854, Skamania County was split from the original Clark County. Also in 1854, Walla Walla County was split from the new Skamania County. In 1875, Columbia County was split from Walla Walla County, and on November 29, 1881, a portion of Columbia County was set off to form Garfield County. The original Garfield County was reduced in size in 1883 when its southeastern area was partitioned off to form Asotin County. It was named for the late U.S. President James A. Garfield, who had been assassinated a few weeks prior.

Geography
It is part of the Palouse, a wide and rolling prairie-like region of the middle Columbia basin.

Geographic features
Alpowa Summit
Snake River

Major highway
 U.S. Route 12
 State Route 127

Adjacent counties
Whitman County - north
Asotin County - east
Wallowa County, Oregon - south
Columbia County - west

National protected area
Umatilla National Forest (part)

Demographics

2000 census
As of the census of 2000, there were 2,397 people, 987 households, and 670 families living in the county.  The population density was 3 people per square mile (1/km2). There were 1,288 housing units at an average density of 2 per square mile (1/km2). The racial makeup of the county was 96.45% White, 0.38% Native American, 0.67% Asian, 0.04% Pacific Islander, 1.38% from other races, and 1.08% from two or more races. 1.96% of the population were Hispanic or Latino of any race. 28.8% were of German, 17.9% United States or American, 10.6% English and 9.5% Irish ancestry. 99.2% spoke English as their first language.

There were 987 households, out of which 28.80% had children under the age of 18 living with them, 57.00% were married couples living together, 6.70% had a female householder with no husband present, and 32.10% were non-families. 28.30% of all households were made up of individuals, and 14.40% had someone living alone who was 65 years of age or older. The average household size was 2.39 and the average family size was 2.93.

In the county, the population was spread out, with 25.90% under the age of 18, 5.40% from 18 to 24, 21.90% from 25 to 44, 25.90% from 45 to 64, and 20.90% who were 65 years of age or older. The median age was 43 years. For every 100 females there were 97.90 males. For every 100 females age 18 and over, there were 93.80 males.

The median income for a household in the county was $33,398, and the median income for a family was $41,645. Males had a median income of $33,313 versus $22,132 for females. The per capita income for the county was $16,992.  About 12.00% of families and 14.20% of the population were below the poverty line, including 17.10% of those under age 18 and 10.20% of those age 65 or over.

2010 census
As of the 2010 census, there were 2,266 people, 989 households, and 650 families living in the county. The racial makeup of the county was 93.8% white, 1.7% Asian, 0.3% American Indian, 2.3% from other races, and 1.9% from two or more races. Those of Hispanic or Latino origin made up 4.0% of the population. In terms of ancestry, 27.2% were German, 22.4% were English, 19.9% were Irish, 7.9% were Dutch, 5.5% were Swedish, and 3.4% were American.

Of the 989 households, 25.1% had children under the age of 18 living with them, 55.6% were married couples living together, 6.1% had a female householder with no husband present, 34.3% were non-families, and 30.2% of all households were made up of individuals. The average household size was 2.25 and the average family size was 2.79. The median age was 49.0 years.

The median income for a household in the county was $42,469 and the median income for a family was $55,769. Males had a median income of $38,897 versus $30,650 for females. The per capita income for the county was $22,825. About 14.1% of families and 15.7% of the population were below the poverty line, including 22.1% of those under age 18 and 6.6% of those age 65 or over.

Communities

City
Pomeroy (county seat)

Unincorporated communities
 Dodge
Gould City
Mayview
Pataha
Peola
Ping

In popular culture
Part of the 1996 film Black Sheep takes place in Garfield County, but was not filmed there.

Politics
Garfield County has consistently voted for Republican candidates in presidential elections throughout its history. In only four elections since 1896 have more voters chosen the Democratic candidate, the most recent being the 1964 election. In 1912 the plurality of votes went instead to the Progressive Party candidate, former Republican president Theodore Roosevelt.

See also
National Register of Historic Places listings in Garfield County, Washington

Footnotes

Further reading
 Frank T. Gilbert, Historic Sketches: Walla Walla, Columbia and Garfield Counties, Washington Territory. Portland, OR: A.G. Walling Printing House, 1882.
 W.D. Lyman, Lyman's History of Old Walla Walla County, Embracing Walla Walla, Columbia, Garfield and Asotin Counties. In Two Volumes. Chicago: S.J. Clarke Publishing Co., 1918. Volume 1 | Volume 2
 Frederic Ambrose Shaver, An Illustrated History of Southeastern Washington, Including Walla Walla, Columbia, Garfield and Asotin Counties, Washington. Spokane, WA: Western Historical Publishing Co., 1906.

 
1881 establishments in Washington Territory
Populated places established in 1881
Washington (state) counties
Eastern Washington